Oregon Ridge Park is a  park in Cockeysville, Maryland. The park features walking and hiking trails, nature center, picnic and recreation areas, a lodge, and cross-country skiing and sledding.

The park is the location of an annual Fourth of July celebration, which includes a concert by the Baltimore Symphony Orchestra.

History
The site for the park was originally owned by John Merryman during the 1800s.

The park was built on the site of some abandoned Goethite (iron ore) and marble quarries dating back to the 1830s. One of the quarries has long since filled with water. It was then used for many years for swimming, with an added sand beach.

The park was previously used for downhill skiing in the 1960s, but warmer temperatures in the region and the cost of artificially producing snow made this usage impractical. Remnants of the lifts are still present, and the main slope is used as a seating area for outdoor concerts.

In 1990, the park acquired the Merryman Tract, which includes the valley of the Baisman Run, expanding to the south of the original park area.

Gallery

External links
Oregon Ridge Park home page
Oregon Ridge Nature Center home page
Entrance to Oregon Ridge on Google Street View

References

Cockeysville, Maryland
Parks in Baltimore County, Maryland
Nature centers in Maryland